The Godfather is a trilogy of American crime films directed by Francis Ford Coppola inspired by the 1969 novel of the same name by Italian American author Mario Puzo. The films follow the trials of the fictional Italian American mafia Corleone family whose patriarch, Vito Corleone, rises to be a major figure in American organized crime. His youngest son, Michael Corleone, becomes his successor. The films were distributed by Paramount Pictures and released in 1972, 1974, and 1990. The series achieved success at the box office, with the films earning between $430 and $517 million worldwide. The Godfather and The Godfather Part II are both seen by many as two of the greatest films of all time. The series is heavily awarded, winning 9 out of 28 total Academy Award nominations.

Film series

The Godfather

The Godfather was released on March 15, 1972. The feature-length film was directed by Francis Ford Coppola and was based on Mario Puzo's novel of the same name. The plot begins with Don Vito Corleone declining an offer to join in the narcotics business with notorious drug lord Virgil Sollozzo, which leads to an assassination attempt. Vito's oldest son Sonny subsequently takes over the family business and he conspires with Michael to strike back for the assassination attempt by having him kill Sollozzo and a corrupt police captain, forcing Michael to go to Sicily in hiding. While in Sicily, Michael travels around the country and meets a woman he marries but who is killed in a car bombing. Michael returns to America after the news of his brother Sonny's murder and marries his former girlfriend Kay. Vito then turns over the reins of the family to Michael. Michael plans to move the family business to Las Vegas; but before the move, his father dies, and he plots the killing of the heads of the five families on the day of his nephew's baptism. Other subplots include Vito's daughter's abusive marriage, Johnny Fontane's success in Hollywood and Vito's second son Fredo's role in the family business in Las Vegas.

The Godfather Part II

The Godfather Part II was released on December 20, 1974. The feature-length film was again directed by Francis Ford Coppola and based upon Mario Puzo's novel of the same name. The film is in part both a sequel and a prequel to The Godfather, presenting two parallel dramas. The main storyline, following the first film's events, centers on Michael Corleone, the new Don of the Corleone crime family, trying to hold his business ventures together from 1958 to 1959; the other is a series of flashbacks following his father, Vito Corleone, from his childhood in Sicily in 1901 to his founding of the Corleone family in New York City.

The Godfather Part III

The Godfather Part III was released on December 25, 1990. Francis Ford Coppola returned as director for the feature-length film, while also writing the screenplay with the help of the author Mario Puzo. In his audio commentary for Part II, Coppola stated it was his belief in the first two films having told the complete Corleone saga with nothing more to add that led him to decline multiple requests from Paramount to make a third installment for over a decade, until severe financial difficulties caused by the critical and commercial failure of One from the Heart (1982) compelled him to accept the long-standing offer. 

The Godfather Part III completes the story of Michael Corleone, who is now trying to legitimize his criminal empire, and shows the rise of Sonny Corleone's illegitimate son Vincent Corleone as Michael's successor. The film also portrays a fictionalized account of real-life events, including the death of Pope John Paul I and the Papal banking scandal of 1981 and 1982, linking them together and with the affairs of Michael Corleone. Coppola has stated he intended for Part III to be an epilogue to the first two films. The film co-stars Sofia Coppola as Mary Corleone, whose performance was received negatively by critics. Leonard Maltin, said of the film that the casting of Sofia Coppola was an "almost-fatal flaw".

Recut version
On December 4, 2020, a recut version of the film titled The Godfather Coda: The Death of Michael Corleone was released in a limited number of theatres as well as being released on Blu-ray and streaming platforms. Coppola said the film is the version he and Puzo had originally envisioned, and it "vindicates" its status among the trilogy and his daughter Sofia's performance.

Cancelled fourth film
Coppola stated that he and Puzo had discussed the potential of a fourth installment. The fourth film was intended to be a prequel and a sequel told in a similar narrative to Part II. They had discussed a potential script seeing Vito Corleone and Sonny gaining the families' political power and racketeering empire during the 1930s; and with Vincent Corleone in the 1980s, haunted by Mary's death, running the family business through a ten-year destructive war and eventually losing the families' business interests, respect and power, seeing one final scene with Michael Corleone before his death, completing the 100-year story of the Corleone family's rise and fall.

Many actors were rumoured to be cast in the film: Robert De Niro, Andy García and Talia Shire were suggested to be reprising their roles. Leonardo DiCaprio was discussed as being cast as a young Sonny Corleone.

In June 1999, The Hollywood Reporter had reported that a fourth film was in the works with García in the lead role. García has since claimed the film's script was nearly produced, but following Puzo's death on 2 July, Coppola decided to retire the film series indefinitely. Puzo's contribution to the potential sequel dealt with the Corleone family in the early 1930s, and was eventually expanded into a novel by Ed Falco and released in 2012 as The Family Corleone. The estate of Puzo had sought to keep Paramount Pictures from producing the film based on The Family Corleone. Now resolved, Paramount has gained the rights to make more Godfather films.

Cast

Reception

Box office performance

Critical response
The films appear in many "Top" film lists, such as AFI's 100 Years...100 Movies, Time magazine's All-Time 100 Movies, the IMDb Top 250, Dallas-Fort Worth Film Critics Association's Top 10 Films, and James Berardinelli's Top 100. The Godfather Trilogy was ranked at No. 5 in Empire magazine's "The 33 Greatest Movie Trilogies" in 2010. The Independent ranked it at No. 6 on its list of "10 greatest movie trilogies of all time". Screen Rant ranked it at No. 4 on its list of "The Best Movie Trilogies Of All Time".

Accolades

Academy Awards
The three films together were nominated for a total of 28 Academy Awards, of which they won nine. The Godfather is the first trilogy to have had all three of its films nominated for Best Picture (The Lord of the Rings is the only other series to achieve this); it is the only film series with two Best Picture winners, with The Godfather and The Godfather Part II winning the award in their respective years. The Godfather Part II is the first sequel film to win Best Picture (The Lord of the Rings: The Return of the King is the only other film to achieve this). For the Best Supporting Actor award, both The Godfather and The Godfather Part II had three actors nominated for the award, which is a rare feat. The Godfather Part II won the most Academy Awards with six to its credit. The Godfather Part III was nominated for seven Oscars, but won none.
 The Godfather — Nominations: 10, Wins: 3
 The Godfather Part II — Nominations: 11, Wins: 6
 The Godfather Part III — Nominations: 7, Wins: 0

Golden Globe Awards
The three films together were nominated for a total of 20 Golden Globe Awards, of which they won five.
 The Godfather — Nominations: 7, Wins: 5
 The Godfather Part II — Nominations: 6, Wins: 0
 The Godfather Part III — Nominations: 7, Wins: 0

Home media and television
Compilations were created by Coppola and editors Barry Malkin and Walter Murch, with two released to home media:
 The Godfather Saga (1977) – 434-minute television miniseries based on the first two films in chronological order and incorporating additional footage that was not included in the theatrical releases (with violence and language toned down for a television audience).
 The Godfather 1902–1959: The Complete Epic (1981) – 386-minute uncensored version of The Godfather Saga that was released directly to video (VHS format). A 423-minute version aired on HBO in 2016 and was released to streaming services.
 The Godfather Trilogy: 1901–1980 (1992) – 583-minute uncensored version of The Godfather Saga released directly to video (VHS and LaserDisc formats) encompassing all three films and incorporating additional footage that the Saga and Epic releases had included.
Other box sets were released in DVD and Blu-ray formats:
 The Godfather DVD Collection (2001) – Includes all three films, commentaries, a documentary entitled The Godfather Family: A Look Inside, additional scenes originally contained in The Godfather Saga, a Corleone family tree, and a Godfather timeline.
 The Godfather: The Coppola Restoration (2008) – Includes all three films, commentaries, and a bonus features disc with new content and extras from Paramount's 2001 DVD release. Also included is an interview with David Chase, the creator of The Sopranos, discussing the cultural significance of the films.
 The Godfather Trilogy: Omerta Edition (2017) – A special 45th anniversary box set edition produced in the "limited" quantity of 45,000 copies, consisting of the Coppola Restoration versions of all three films on Blu-ray, a bonus feature Blu-ray disc, and various jacket-liner materials including quote cards, word-play magnets, and scene notes ("anatomy of a scene").
 The Godfather Trilogy (2022) – A 50th anniversary Blu-ray box set consisting of The Godfather, The Godfather Part II, and The Godfather Coda: The Death of Michael Corleone, along with old and new bonus materials. The Ultra HD Blu-ray version includes remastered and restored versions of all three films in 4K resolution, plus all three cuts of the third film: the original theatrical cut (previously unreleased on home video), the 1991 director's cut, and the 2020 Coda cut.

Video games
A side-scrolling shooter, The Godfather (1991), was the first video game based on the series. The Godfather: The Game (2006) was based on the first film. Duvall, Caan, and Brando supplied voiceovers and their likenesses, but Pacino did not. Francis Ford Coppola openly voiced his disapproval of the game. The Godfather II (2009) was based on the second film. A mobile game, The Godfather: Family Dynasty (2017), was released for iOS and Android devices.

Notes

References

Further reading 
 
 
 
 
 

 
Paramount Pictures franchises
Organized crime in fiction